Yevgeni Nikolayevich Polovina (born 16 August 1979) is a former Russian football player.

References

1979 births
Living people
Russian footballers
FC Chernomorets Novorossiysk players
Russian Premier League players
FC Slavyansk Slavyansk-na-Kubani players
Association football forwards